Sonya Yoncheva (born 25 December 1981) is a Bulgarian operatic soprano.

Early life
Yoncheva was born in Plovdiv, Bulgaria. From the age of 6, she was "working", according to her own words from an interview for Metropolis. She studied piano and voice at the National School for Music and Dance in Plovdiv. During her teenage years, she hosted a Bulgarian television show about music. She won several music competitions in Bulgaria in 2000 and 2001, including a joint win with her brother as "Singers of the Year 2000" in the "Hit-1" competition organised and produced by Bulgarian National Television.

She took advanced studies in classical singing with Danielle Borst at the Conservatoire de Musique de Genève and obtained the master's degree in 2009.

Career
Yoncheva was an invited participant in William Christie's "Jardin des Voix" academy for young singers in 2007. She has continued work in the baroque repertoire with Christie, and also with Emmanuelle Haïm.

Yoncheva was the female first-place winner of the 2010 Operalia competition and the special CulturArte prize. In June she performed in L'elisir d'amore as Adina as part of Festival Nuits Musicales Sainte Victoire in Peynier.

Her debut at the Metropolitan Opera was in November 2013 when she stepped in as Gilda in Rigoletto, in advance of her previously scheduled official debut. In 2014 at the Met, she sang her stage role debut as Mimì (La bohème) in November and shared the role of Violetta (La traviata) in December. In 2015 she appeared as Desdemona in the season opening production of Otello the Metropolitan Opera and in September 2016 she made her debut as Norma at the Royal Opera House, where she sang Antonia in Les contes d'Hoffmann in November of the same year.

In June 2017 she made her debut at the Teatro alla Scala as Mimì in La bohème. She made her role debut in the title role of Puccini's Tosca at the Metropolitan Opera for their 2017/18 season to great critical acclaim. Yoncheva set a record as first singer to appear in leading roles in three movie-theater broadcasts of the Metropolitan Opera in one season (Tosca, Mimi in La bohème and Luisa Miller in the 2017/18 season). Other role debuts in the 2017/18 season include Luisa Miller at the Metropolitan Opera and Élisabeth de Valois in Don Carlos at the Paris Opera. For her role debut as Imogene in Bellini's Il pirata at the Teatro alla Scala in June 2018, the first production of the piece after a legendary 1958 staging with Maria Callas as Imogene the press proclaimed that her performance would "surely see Yoncheva enter La Scala's hall of fame alongside Callas". In summer 2018 Yoncheva sang the role of Poppea in L'incoronazione di Poppea at the Salzburg Festival.

Yoncheva began the 2018/19 season performing the title role of Médée in a staging at Staatsoper Berlin conducted by Daniel Barenboim. Other performances in 2018/19 included Desdemona in Verdi's Otello and the title part of Iolanta at the Metropolitan Opera, Desdemona in a new production for Festspielhaus Baden-Baden and at the Berlin Philharmonic Hall as well as Tosca at Staatsoper Berlin.

In the spring of 2019, Sonya Yoncheva announced that she was expecting her second child in the coming fall as a result of which she did not perform from mid July to November 2019. She returned to the stage for the concerts of the Puccini Gala  at the Elbphilharmonie in Hamburg, the Tchaikovsky Hall in Moscow, and in Sofia. In the 2019/20 season, she performed Mimì in La bohème at the Royal Opera House Covent Garden, the title role of Médée at the Staatsoper Berlin and as Imogene in Il pirata to the Teatro Real in Madrid. Several important role debuts in the 2019/20 and 2020/21 season had to be cancelled due to the COVID-19 pandemic, among them her first Manon Lescaut, Leonora in Il trovatore and Rusalka at the Metropolitan Opera as well as Fedora at the Teatro alla Scala.

In Spring 2020, Yoncheva returned to the stage after the first European lockdown as the soprano soloist of Ludwig van Beethoven's 9th Symphony at the Victoria Hall in Geneva, telecast by Arte. She also participated in the 2020 edition of Le Concert de Paris in front of the Eiffel Tower in Paris, performed the title role of La traviata at the Maggio Musicale Fiorentino and appeared in concert at the Salzburg Festival, at the Arena di Verona, in Lucca and Caserta.

In June 2020, Yoncheva announced the creation of her newborn company SY11 and a gala concert organised by the company for August at the Roman Theatre of Plovdiv. 
 
In summer 2020, Sonya Yoncheva and Rolex announced a concert series in aid of musicians affected by the pandemic and the ongoing cancellations. Yoncheva was the host of the "Perpetual Music" concert at the Staatsoper Unter den Linden in Berlin in September, featuring 14 singers and instrumentalists.

Engagements until the end of 2020 included solo concerts to open the season of the Würth Philharmoniker and the Antwerp Symphony Orchestra, the title role of Tosca at the Bayerische Staatsoper, the Season Inauguration Gala A Riveder le Stelle of the Teatro alla Scala and a Christmas concert hosted by the German president Frank-Walter Steinmeier and telecast by ZDF.

Sonya Yoncheva began the year 2021 starring in the Metropolitan Opera's "Met Stars Live in Concert" streaming concert series, which saw her singing arias and songs from the Schussenried Abbey in Germany. On French television, she appeared in "Fauteils d'Orchestre" on France 5, before embarking on a series of recitals and concerts throughout Spain, which brought her to Valencia, Bilbao and Madrid, where she performed her first Zarzuela concert at the Teatro de la Zarzuela. With the NOSPR led by her husband Domingo Hindoyan, Yoncheva sang Henri Duparc "L'Invitation Au Voyage" in Katowice, before starring in the title role of Tosca at the Wiener Staatsoper. In June, she took part in the Gala "Musiques en Fête" at the Chorégies d'Orange, telecast by France 3. Sonya Yoncheva's busy summer season also included Stephana in Umberto Giordano rarity Siberia at the Maggio Musicale in Florence, a production of La traviata at the Arena di Verona that was recorded for telecasts on ZDF and 3sat, recitals and concerts in Toulouse, Munich, Baden-Baden, Ljubljana, Montpellier, Sofia, Bucharest and the Salzburg Festival.

Awards and honors
Yoncheva is a Rolex artist and was named Medici.tv's 2017 Artist of the Year. She is also the winner of the 2019 Readers Award of the International Opera Awards. In 2021, Sonya Yoncheva received a number of honors: she was named honorary citizen of her hometown Plovdiv and received Germany's most important classical music award Opus Klassik as "Singer of the Year" for her solo album "Rebirth".

She won a Young Artist of the Year award in 2015 Echo Klassik. In 2016, she was awarded the Order of Saints Cyril and Methodius for her "contribution to the field of art". She was one of the recipients of the 13th annual Opera News Awards. She was presented Award of the Year from the Círculo Críticos de Arte de Chile for her recital at the Teatro del Lago.
Since November 2021, Sonya Yoncheva is a UNICEF Ambassador for Bulgaria, standing up for the rights of children.

Personal life
Yoncheva married Venezuelan conductor Domingo Hindoyan in July 2014 and they live in the Canton of Vaud, Switzerland. The couple have a son, Mateo, born 6 October 2014. In October 2019, their daughter Sophia was born.
Her younger brother Marin Yonchev is a former rock singer and is now appearing in operatic concerts alongside Yoncheva.

Controversies
In March 2023 Yoncheva came under fire for referring to her critics as “vocal racists” as well as publically dismissing Zachary Woolfe for his review of her performance in a Met production of Bellini’s Norma. Some found her accusations tasteless in their trivialisation of social issues while others defended her stance after she cited she had been harassed by internet trolls on social media.

Discography
Yoncheva is featured on commercial audio recordings on the Virgin Classics label. In November 2013, she signed a recording contract with Sony Classical and has released several solo CDs including:
 2015: Paris, mon amour, Orquestra de la Comunitat Valenciana conducted by Frédéric Chaslin (Sony)
 2017: Handel, Academia Montis Regalis, Alessandro De Marchi (conductor) (Sony)
 2018: The Verdi Album, Münchner Rundfunkorchester conducted by Massimo Zanetti (Sony)
 2021: Rebirth, Cappella Mediterranea conducted by Leonardo García Alarcó (Sony)
 2022: "Giordano: Siberia", Orchestra del Maggio Musicale Fiorentino, conducted by Gianandrea Noseda 

On video she appears in DVD releases of Monteverdi's L'incoronazione di Poppea and Il ritorno d'Ulisse in patria, and of Pergolesi's Il Flaminio. Additionally, she is featured on Pergolesi's "Stabat Mater" and Mozart's "Le Nozze di Figaro" on Deutsche Grammophon. She can be seen as Desdemona in the Met Opera's HD streaming video of Otello (2015). In 2016, she substituted for Anna Netrebko in Covent Garden's controversial season opener of Bellini's Norma, issued on DVD by Opus Arte.
On DVD/Blu-Ray, she can also be seen on recordings of La bohème and Les Contes d'Hoffmann from the Royal Opera House Covent Garden, Iolanta from Paris Opera, and in the ZDF Adventskonzert 2015 from Dresden.

Documentary
 Sonya Yoncheva: Sempre Libera (2018). directed by Ema Konstantinova and Georgi Toshev. premiered at the 32nd Kinomania Film Festival in Sofia on 26 November 2018.

References

External links
 
 
 Sonya Yoncheva at Opéra national de Paris
 Sonya Yoncheva at Sony Classical
 Sonya Yoncheva at Medici.tv

1981 births
Living people
Musicians from Plovdiv
Bulgarian operatic sopranos
Bulgarian expatriates in Switzerland
Operalia, The World Opera Competition prize-winners
21st-century Bulgarian women opera singers
Sony Classical Records artists